Design prototyping in its broader definition comprises the actions to make, test and analyse a prototype, a model or a mockup according to one or various purposes in different stages  of the design process. Other definitions consider prototyping as the methods or techniques for making a prototype (e.g., rapid prototyping techniques), or a stage in the design process (prototype development, prototype or prototyping). The concept of prototyping in design disciplines' literature is also related to the concepts of experimentation (i.e., an iterative problem-solving process of trying, failing and improving), and Research through Design (RtD) (i.e., designers make a prototype with the purpose of conducting research and generating knowledge while trying it, rather than aiming to improving it to become a final product).

Background 
Initial references to the concept of prototyping in design could be traced to the proceedings of the Conference on Design Methods  in 1962:

In 1968, Bruce Archer, a relevant figure in the "Design Methods Movement" describes the design process. One of the stages of the process is called  "Prototype development" and it indicates activities to build and test a prototype. Thus, it would be possible to say that from a design methods' perspective, prototyping recalls a process in which a prototype is built, tried out and tested. In the same line, additional references to prototyping can be found in later editions of the Design Research Society's Conferences. For example, referring to build models and use them to consult people out of the design team, review the model  and make decisions on how to modify the design proposal; or describing modelling (creating a model) and model simulation.

However, one of the first documented uses of the term prototyping linked to a design process appears in 1983 in A systematic look at prototyping  in the field of information systems and software development. The work of Floyd was inspired by the discussions among the scholars who were preparing the Working Conference on Prototyping. It focuses on prototype as a process, rather than the artefact and how prototyping could be applied to the full solution (or product) or parts of it seeking to improve the final output. Although this work was not developed within the design discipline, it provides a comprehensive characterisation of prototyping by defining its steps, purposes and strategies. Moreover, it serves as a referent to further studies of design prototyping. 

Later, around the year of 1990, the availability of methods for rapidly manufacturing models and prototypes stimulated the publication of a great body of literature dedicated to rapid prototyping techniques and technologies (e.g., 3D printing). Technologies for additive manufacturing (i.e., adding material) or substractive manufacturing (i.e., removing material) together with the use of software for computer-aided design (CAD), leveraged prototype building but also the fabrication of products in limited numbers.

Along the years, further efforts have been dedicated to characterising prototyping in design disciplines in the fields of interaction design, experience design, product design and service design, as well as in product-design-related fields such as engineering/mechanical design.  In 2000, designers from IDEO described experience prototyping, introducing types of design representations and methods that allow to simulate aspects of an interaction that people experience by themselves. Experience prototyping can combine various types of prototypes such as spaces, products and interfaces to resemble what the real experience could be like. Around the year of 2010, studies were developed to examine the prototyping of services theorising from the growing practice of service design, which later in 2018 were also used as a reference for service design practitioners.

Prototyping cycle 
Prototyping is developed in an iterative cycle of making, testing and analysing which allows to examine dimensions of a solution before its future implementation, anticipating to possible issues and improving them earlier in the process. This cycle can be portrayed the following steps: 

 Preparation: to decide the aims of prototyping, define questions and assumptions that are going to be examined, identify the participants of the prototyping sessions and the dimensions of the prototype that are going to be tested.
 Making: some or various dimensions will be represented in a prototype (e.g., material, form or function)  employing an appropriate depending on the purpose. The relevance on making on design has been increasing in the last years and transforming while new design disciplines emerge. For instance, whilst sketches were previously another category of visual design representations, today they could also be considered prototypes in service design.
 Testing: the prototyping session develops in a defined setup with certain characteristics of space and environment and will follow a method to gather feedback.
 Analysing: the results of the testing will be integrated into the solution and updated in the following prototype versions.

One example of this cycle could be the design of a digital interface in the early stages of the process applying paper prototyping. In this case, prototyping may seek to explore and evaluate multiple alternatives of ideas with the users as fast and cheap as possible, before investing time to program it. Thus, the prototypes will represent the structure of the interface by using simple forms and text to indicate the elements (1). A common technique for creating prototypes of digital interfaces would be to sketch wireframes in paper (2). The team will meet with a potential user and the wireframes will be presented by the design researcher. The user will simulate to click the elements and explain the actions that intends to do while moving to other sheets that represent other screens in the navigation flow (3). The feedback gathered will be used to make decisions on the aspects that need to be modified and the layout of the interface will be updated (4).

Characteristics of prototyping 
To prepare for prototyping, some aspects need to be decided. For this purpose, it is useful to individualise and consider various characteristics that will allow identifying how prototyping should be developed according to the design needs. In this regard, the prototyping framework proposed by Blomkvist and Holmid could provide some guidelines. As a result of a literature review, they identify a set of characteristics which are:

Position in the process 

Whilst for some scholars prototyping was happening in a particular stage of the design process, the importance of prototyping has been gaining relevance as a continuous activity since the early stages of the process. Considering in which moment of the process prototyping is going to be developed will guide decisions on its purpose and further characteristics of prototyping.

Purpose 
Prototyping can be developed according to different aims of the design process that influence decisions such as what variables of the prototype are going to be examined and who is going to be involved in the testing session. For example, in the early stages of the process, the need could be to explore various ideas within the design team and prototypes may be created fast and with little resources, while at the end of the process the functionality of the solution may be evaluated with future users so the prototype would largely resemble its final version.

Some of the purposes of prototyping identified by different authors are:

Stakeholder 
A prototyping session can involve a variety of people related to the solution. Internal to the organisation, the participants could range from the members of the design team to colleagues from other departments and managers. External to the organisation, prototyping could involve future users and clients, and representatives from other organisations. The selection of the participants would depend on the purposes of prototyping.  For instance, a prototyping session for exploration could be developed internally with colleagues in order to get quick feedback about initial design proposals. Another example would be to involve users in co-design prototyping sessions in order to explore proposals directly with future users.

Activity 
The activity refers to the method that would be used for testing a prototype, the context in which it is going to occur, and the strategies for testing in relation to what would be the real conditions of use of the solution.

Prototype 

Prototypes can represent one component of a future solution such as "(Inter)actions, service processes, experiences, physical objects, environments, spaces, architecture, digital artifacts and software, ecosystems, [or] (business) value"  or comprise various of these components.

Moreover, a prototype can reflect one or multiple dimensions of the future solution and a variety of aspects could be considered. A simple approach would be to think on the fidelity, meaning how close the prototype resembles to the final solution (blom)(stick). More comprehensive approaches can be considered through multiple dimensions. For instance, Houde and Hill describe the “role” (i.e., functionality for the user), “look and feel” (i.e., sensory, and experiential aspects), “implementation” (i.e., performance of the solution). Lim, Stolterman and Tenenberg propose a classification of prototypes according to “filtering dimensions: functionality, interactivity, and spatial structure"; and “manifestation dimensions:materials, resolution, and scope". They suggest these dimensions can be pondered in order to decide how the prototype should be.

See also 

 Prototype
 Model 
 Mockup 
 Rapid prototyping
 Design methods
 Interaction design
 User experience design
 Product design
 Service design
 Participatory design - co-design

References 

Design
Human–computer interaction
Industrial design
Product development